The 2002 edition of the Campeonato Carioca kicked off on January 26 and ended on June 27, 2002. It is the official tournament organized by FFERJ (Federação de Futebol do Estado do Rio de Janeiro, or Rio de Janeiro State Football Federation. Only clubs based in the Rio de Janeiro State are allowed to play. Eighteen teams contested this edition. Due to multiple schedule conflicts with the Rio-São Paulo tournament that year, the big teams used mostly reserve teams in the first phase. Fluminense won the title for the 29th time, however, due to an incident in the semifinals, the title remained under dispute until 2009. Entrerriense, CFZ, Cabofriense, Serrano, Portuguesa, São Cristóvão and Itaperuna were relegated.

System
The tournament was divided in five stages:
 Preliminary tournament: The five worst teams of the 2001 championship joined the champions and the runner-up of the Second Level; each team played against each other in a double round-robin format, and the best team would qualify to the main tournament. 
 Taça Guanabara: The 12 clubs all played in single round-robin format against each other. 
 Taça Rio: The 12 clubs all played in single round-robin format against each other. 
 Second phase: The four best-placed teams in the Aggregate table of the Taças Guanabara and Rio and the 'big four' (Botafogo, Flamengo, Fluminense and Vasco), who qualified regardless of placing in the aggregate table, were divided into two groups of four, in which each team played once against the teams of its own group, and the two best place teams in each group qualified to the Semifinals.
 Semifinals and Finals: The semifinals would the played in a single match. in case of a tie, the team with the best season record would advance, and the Finals would happen in two matches, both played at the Maracanã Stadium.

Championship

Preliminary phase

Taça Guanabara

Taça Rio

Aggregate table

Second phase

Group A

Group B

Semifinals

Finals

References

Campeonato Carioca seasons
Carioca